Givanildo Vieira de Sousa (born 25 July 1986), known as Hulk, is a Brazilian professional footballer who plays as a forward for Atlético Mineiro.

After starting out professionally with Vitória and then playing three years in Japan, he played several seasons in Portugal with Porto, winning ten titles – including the 2010–11 UEFA Europa League and three national championships. He was crowned the league's top scorer once. In 2012, he joined Russian Premier League side Zenit Saint Petersburg for €60 million, winning all three domestic honours and being named the competition's best player and being top scorer, once each. He was transferred to Shanghai SIPG for an Asian record €58.6 million in 2016.

Hulk made his international debut in 2009, and played for Brazil at the 2012 Summer Olympics as one of the three permitted over-age players. He went on to represent the Brazilian senior team in their 2013 FIFA Confederations Cup victory and fourth-place finish at the 2014 FIFA World Cup.

He is described by FIFA's official website as "a direct powerhouse of a centre- or wide-forward who knows his way around the box". He is strongly built for a footballer and acquired his nickname due to his likeness to actor Lou Ferrigno, who played the Incredible Hulk on the eponymous television show in the 1970s.

Club career

Brazil and Japan
Born in Campina Grande, Paraíba, Hulk started playing professionally with Esporte Clube Vitória in Salvador, Bahia, then went on loan to Japan to play for Kawasaki Frontale. Despite having been purchased on 15 January 2006, he was loaned to second division Consadole Sapporo, effective on 1 February, where he played all the 2006 season and scored 25 goals, one less than the top scorer.

In 2007, he was loaned again to a second division team, Tokyo Verdy, where he was even more effective, scoring 37 goals in 42 matches and being the top goal scorer of the season. He briefly returned to Kawasaki in 2008 and rejoined Verdy after only 18 matches.

Porto
After Hulk's stay in Japan, he moved to Portugal to join defending champions Porto, who purchased 50% of his playing rights for €5.5 million from Uruguayan side Rentistas, with the transfer fee being received by an unnamed investor.

When Moroccan teammate Tarik Sektioui suffered an injury, Hulk was given an opportunity to play forward and scored his first official domestic league goal for Porto in a 2–0 home win against C.F. Os Belenenses, later adding against F.C. Paços de Ferreira (same venue and result), both as a second-half substitute. As the season advanced, he became an undisputed starter, forming an attacking trio with Cristian Rodríguez and Lisandro López, with the trio often shifting positions. After some stellar performances in the season's UEFA Champions League, he was elected as one of the Top 10 Rising Stars by UEFA.com. In late August 2009, he extended his contract to June 2014, with a buy-out clause increased to €100 million.

In the 2009–10 season, Hulk established as an automatic first-choice. However, following a tunnel brawl during the league loss against S.L. Benfica (1–0) on 20 December 2009, he received a four-month ban (if the disciplinary hearing upheld the ban, he faced up to three years on the sidelines), only for the domestic competitions, as did his teammate Cristian Săpunaru. The ban was later reduced to four matches, and the player returned to league action on 28 March 2010 after missing 3 months and 18 matches, scoring in a 3–0 win at Belenenses. One week later, he also scored in a 4–1 home victory over C.S. Marítimo. With six less matches played than the previous season, he ended with five league goals.

Hulk started the 2010–11 season scoring 16 times in his first 16 official matches, including a hat-trick against K.R.C. Genk in the UEFA Europa League play-off stage, on 26 August 2010 (4–2 home win, 7–2 on aggregate). From September to January, he won the Portuguese Championship Player of the Month, making him the only player to have won the award six times. On 7 November 2010, he scored the last two goals as Porto trounced Benfica 5–0 at home, creating a ten-point difference between the two teams, with the northerners leading the league, and eventually winning it, with the player leading the goalscoring charts.

On 13 May 2011, Porto paid €13.5 million to Rentistas for another 40% of Hulk's playing rights, bringing their total stake to 85% (Porto sold back 5% after renewing his contract in 2009), with the player signing a new contract valid until 2016 and with a buy-out clause of €100 million. He finished the season with 36 goals in 53 official matches, with his team winning four major titles, including a league/cup double.

On 7 April 2012, Hulk scored the solitary goal as Porto defeated S.C. Braga away to go four points clear at the top of the Primeira Liga table. He scored six goals in the following three matches, including a brace in a 2–0 home defeat of Sporting CP, and finished the 2011–12 season with 16 league goals as his team won another national championship. In May 2012, he was voted the Player of the Month for April for a record sixth time, and he added 11 assists, a competition best.

On 17 February 2014, Hulk was ordered to pay a €45,000 fine for assaulting two stewards at the Estádio da Luz.

Zenit
On 3 September 2012, Hulk completed a transfer of €60 million, with Porto receiving €40 million, to Russian Premier League club FC Zenit Saint Petersburg, reuniting with former Porto teammate Bruno Alves. This transfer fee caused a lot of debate and a great stir since Mitrofanov, General director from Zenit denied publicly. Russian media R-Sport even claimed that Mitrofanov had shown the media the sales contract and the fee on the contract was €40 million and not €60 million. However, Porto also confirmed in its unaudited quarterly report in Q1 2012–13 that the club did not pay for third parties ownership (15%), agent fee nor solidarity contribution (5%), which all normally included in the transfer fee, as in the case of Radamel Falcao.

Hulk scored his first goal for his new club in only his second league match, against FC Krylia Sovetov Samara, finding the net with a trademark shot from outside the box in a 2–2 away draw.

In the second half of September, media speculation reported that teammates Igor Denisov and Aleksandr Kerzhakov were unsatisfied with Hulk's wage, and that they demanded renegotiation of their contracts. As a result, they were sent to the youth squad. Denisov replied in an interview with Sport Express stating that his stand-off with club management was over "the proper organisation of the team. And respect for the Russian players which Zenit has always relied upon". A few days after the feud, he scored and assisted in a 2–1 win against FC Baltika Kaliningrad for the fifth round of the Russian Cup. A few weeks later, he scored his first Champions League goal for Zenit and provided an assist in a 3–2 loss against A.C. Milan in the second matchday of group stage.

After falling out with head coach Luciano Spalletti, Hulk declared he was seeking to leave the club in January. However, FIFA regulations ban players from playing for more than two clubs in a season, forcing him to stay in Russia at least until June 2013. Eventually, he revealed he made amends with the club's management and that things have been resolved. In a 3–1 loss against the Ukrainian side of Shakhtar Donetsk, he suffered a head injury after falling under a challenge and connecting his head with a Shakhtar defender's studs in the second half. He was then taken to a local Dubai hospital. Following Zenit's third-place finish in the Champions League group stage, the club entered into the Europa League. He scored a goal in each leg of Zenit's knockout phase match to eliminate English side Liverpool from the Europa League in the round of 32 by away goals, despite losing 3–1 in the second leg. On 4 May 2013, he scored his first hat-trick of his Zenit career and assisted a goal, in a 4–0 win over league strugglers Alania Vladikavkaz.

On 16 February 2015, Hulk signed two-year contract extension with the club. On 17 May, his free kick in a 1–1 draw at FC Ufa gave Zenit the league title with two matches to spare.

Hulk was due to be an assistant at the draw for 2018 World Cup qualification in Saint Petersburg, but withdrew due to commitments with Zenit, being replaced by Alexey Smertin.

Hulk was named by UEFA as one of the top XI players of the 2015–16 UEFA Champions League group stage.

Shanghai SIPG
On 30 June 2016, Hulk joined Chinese club Shanghai SIPG from Zenit for a reported £45 million, an Asian football record. He would earn £320,000 per week, accumulating to £16.6 million per year. On 10 July, Hulk forced Ryan McGowan's own goal nine minutes into his debut in a 5–0 win over Henan Jianye. However, just 12 minutes later, he was stretchered off the pitch with a muscle injury. On 9 September, Hulk scored his first two goals for Shanghai SIPG against Beijing Guoan after a two-month injury lay-off.

Hulk made a total of 145 appearances and scored a total of 77 goals across all competitions during his time in Shanghai.

Atlético Mineiro
On 29 January 2021, Hulk returned to Brazil and joined Atlético Mineiro on a two-year contract. He made his debut on 7 March, assisting the fourth goal for Diego Tardelli in a 4–0 Campeonato Mineiro win over Uberlândia. On 19 March, he scored his first goal for the club, from a penalty kick, in a 3–0 win over Coimbra.

After a tough spell in April, with six games without scoring and being relegated to the bench, Hulk picked up his form in the Copa Libertadores against América de Cali and Cerro Porteño, scoring a brace in each game. On 22 May, Atlético were crowned the Campeonato Mineiro champions, and Hulk was voted by journalists into the team of the tournament.

On 17 July, Hulk scored both goals in a 2–1 turnaround win over Corinthians, in the Série A. In the next round, he again scored twice in a 3–0 win over Bahia. On 21 November, he became top scorer of the league after yet another brace in a 2–0 win over Juventude. On 2 December, when Atlético played for the league title and was 2–0 down against Bahia at the Fonte Nova arena, Hulk kick-started a comeback by scoring from a penalty; five minutes later, a brace from Keno snatched the three points that secured the 2021 Série A trophy to Galo. In the following match, a 4–3 win over Red Bull Bragantino at the Mineirão, Hulk scored his 19th goal in 35 appearances, ending the league season as top scorer.

Hulk appeared in all ten matches of Atlético's Copa do Brasil-winning campaign, scoring once in eight of them, including both legs of the final against Athletico Paranaense. He became only the second player to be top scorer in both the Série A and Copa do Brasil in a same season, repeating Gabriel Barbosa's feat in 2018.

Hulk was the country's top scorer in 2021, with a total of 36 goals in 68 appearances, while also providing 13 assists. His central role in Atlético's treble-winning season earned him the Bola de Ouro, Craque do Brasileirão and Copa do Brasil Golden Ball awards. He was also included in CONMEBOL's Libertadores Team of the Tournament and El País' South American Team of the Year.

International career

Hulk made his debut for Brazil on 14 November 2009 in a friendly match against England in Doha, as the Seleção managed a 1–0 victory. On 26 May 2012, he scored his first three international goals in a 3–1 win against Denmark at the Imtech Arena, Hamburg.

On 9 June 2012, in a friendly with Argentina, Hulk scored in a 3–4 loss. In July, he was named as one of three overaged players for Mano Menezes' Brazilian squad for the 2012 Summer Olympics in London, and he appeared in all but one of the matches during the tournament, netting in the 1–2 final loss against Mexico.

In June 2013, Hulk represented Brazil at the 2013 FIFA Confederations Cup. He played in every match as the team's starting right-winger, including the final, where Brazil defeated world champions Spain to win its fourth Confederations Cup title.

At the 2014 World Cup, in the round of 16 match against Chile in Belo Horizonte, Hulk had a goal disallowed for a handball. In the shootout, he had his penalty saved by Claudio Bravo, although Brazil nonetheless advanced.

In August 2021, after 5 years of exclusion, Hulk was recalled to the Brazil national team for the 2022 FIFA World Cup qualifiers.

Personal life 
Hulk was previously married to Iran Angelo de Souza, who he met in Japan. The pair married in 2007 before separating in July 2019. They have two sons, Ian and Tiago, and a daughter, Alice. After splitting from Iran, Hulk began dating her niece, Camila Angelo in October 2019.

It was reported in March 2020 that Hulk had married Camila, in part due to her needing a visa to stay in China with Hulk. They have since revealed they are expecting their first baby together. The baby will be Hulk's fourth child.

Career statistics

Club

International

Scores and results list Brazil's goal tally first, score column indicates score after each Hulk goal.

Goals in the Summer Olympics

Honours
Porto
Primeira Liga: 2008–09, 2010–11, 2011–12, 2012–13
Taça de Portugal: 2008–09, 2009–10, 2010–11
Supertaça Cândido de Oliveira: 2009, 2010, 2011
UEFA Europa League: 2010–11

Zenit Saint Petersburg
Russian Premier League: 2014–15
Russian Cup: 2015–16
Russian Super Cup: 2015

Shanghai SIPG
Chinese Super League: 2018
Chinese FA Super Cup: 2019

Atlético Mineiro
Campeonato Brasileiro Série A: 2021
Copa do Brasil: 2021
Campeonato Mineiro: 2021, 2022
Supercopa do Brasil: 2022

Brazil Olympic
Summer Olympic Games Silver Medal: 2012

Brazil
FIFA Confederations Cup: 2013

Individual
J2 League Top scorer: 2007 (37 goals)
Primeira Liga Breakthrough Player of the Year: 2008–09
Primeira Liga Player of the Year: 2010–11, 2011–12
Primeira Liga Top goalscorer: 2010–11 
SJPF Player of the Month: February 2009, September 2010, October 2010, December 2010, January 2011, April 2012
Russian Premier League Top goalscorer: 2014–15 
Russian Premier League Best Right Winger: 2012–13, 2013–14
Russian Premier League Player of the Month: September 2013
Footballer of the Year in Russia (Sport-Express): 2014–15
Footballer of the Year in Russia (Futbol): 2015
UEFA Champions League Team of the Group Stage: 2015
Chinese Super League Team of the Year: 2017, 2018
Campeonato Mineiro Team of the Tournament: 2021, 2022
South American Team of the Year: 2021
Campeonato Brasileiro Série A Player of the Year: 2021
Campeonato Brasileiro Série A Team of the Year: 2021
Campeonato Brasileiro Série A Top goalscorer: 2021 
Bola de Ouro: 2021
Bola de Prata: 2021
Copa do Brasil Best Player: 2021
Copa do Brasil Top goalscorer: 2021
Campeonato Mineiro Top goalscorer: 2022

Footnotes

References

External links

1986 births
Living people
People from Campina Grande
Brazilian footballers
Association football wingers
Association football forwards
Esporte Clube Vitória players
Kawasaki Frontale players
Hokkaido Consadole Sapporo players
Tokyo Verdy players
FC Porto players
FC Zenit Saint Petersburg players
Shanghai Port F.C. players
Clube Atlético Mineiro players
Campeonato Brasileiro Série A players
J1 League players
J2 League players
Primeira Liga players
Russian Premier League players
Chinese Super League players
UEFA Europa League winning players
Olympic footballers of Brazil
Brazil international footballers
Footballers at the 2012 Summer Olympics
2013 FIFA Confederations Cup players
2014 FIFA World Cup players
Copa América Centenario players
Medalists at the 2012 Summer Olympics
Olympic silver medalists for Brazil
Olympic medalists in football
FIFA Confederations Cup-winning players
Brazilian expatriate footballers
Brazilian expatriate sportspeople in Japan
Brazilian expatriate sportspeople in Portugal
Brazilian expatriate sportspeople in Russia
Brazilian expatriate sportspeople in China
Expatriate footballers in Japan
Expatriate footballers in Portugal
Expatriate footballers in Russia
Expatriate footballers in China
Sportspeople from Paraíba